The Design of Experiments is a 1935 book by the English statistician Ronald Fisher about the design of experiments and is considered a foundational work in experimental design. Among other contributions, the book introduced the concept of the null hypothesis in the context of the lady tasting tea experiment. A chapter is devoted to the Latin square.

Chapters
 Introduction
 The principles of experimentation, illustrated by a psycho-physical experiment
 A historical experiment on growth rate
 An agricultural experiment in randomized blocks
 The Latin square
 The factorial design in experimentation
 Confounding
 Special cases of partial confounding
 The increase of precision by concomitant measurements. Statistical Control
 The generalization of null hypotheses. Fiducial probability
 The measurement of amount of information in general

Quotations regarding the null hypothesis

Fisher introduced the null hypothesis by an example, the now famous Lady tasting tea experiment, as a casual wager.  She claimed the ability to determine the means of tea preparation by taste.  Fisher proposed an experiment and an analysis to test her claim.  She was to be offered 8 cups of tea, 4 prepared by each method, for determination.  He proposed the null hypothesis that she possessed no such ability, so she was just guessing.  With this assumption, the number of correct guesses (the test statistic) formed a hypergeometric distribution.  Fisher calculated that her chance of guessing all cups correctly was 1/70.  He was provisionally willing to concede her ability (rejecting the null hypothesis) in this case only.  Having an example, Fisher commented:

 "...the null hypothesis is never proved or established, but is possibly disproved, in the course of experimentation. Every experiment may be said to exist only in order to give the facts a chance of disproving the null hypothesis."
 "...the null hypothesis must be exact, that is free from vagueness and ambiguity, because it must supply the basis of the 'problem of distribution,' of which the test of significance is the solution."
 "We may, however, choose any null hypothesis we please, provided it is exact."

Regarding an alternative non-directional significance test of the Lady tasting tea experiment:  
 "For this purpose the new test proposed would be entirely inappropriate, and no experimenter would be tempted to employ it. Mathematically, however, it is as valid as any other, in that with proper randomisation it is demonstrable that it would give a significant result with known probability, if the null hypothesis were true."

Regarding which test of significance to apply:
 "The notion that different tests of significance are appropriate to test different features of the same null hypothesis presents no difficulty to workers engaged in practical experimentation, but has been the occasion of much theoretical discussion among statisticians."

On selecting the appropriate experimental measurement and null hypothesis:
 "This question, when the answer to it is not already known, can be fruitfully discussed only when the experimenter has in view, not a single null hypothesis, but a class of such hypotheses, in the significance of deviations from each of which he is equally interested."

See also
Statistical Methods for Research Workers (1925)
Combinatorics of Experimental Design (1987)
List of important publications in statistics

Notes

References
 

1935 non-fiction books
Statistics books